Darko Dražić (born 17 January 1963) is a Bosnian Croat football manager and former professional player who was most recently the manager of Azadegan League club Mes Rafsanjan.

Club career
Dražić was born in Novi Travnik. He played for Solin, Hajduk Split, Fortuna Düsseldorf, Šibenik and Rot-Weiß Oberhausen.

International career
Dražić made his debut for the Croatia national team in an October 1990 friendly match against the United States and has earned a total of two caps, scoring no goals. His second and final international was a June 1991 friendly away against Slovenia. Since Croatia was still officially part of Yugoslavia at the time, both games were unofficial.

Managerial career
Dražić became the coach of NK GOŠK Gabela in 2011 but resigned after he was selected as assistant manager of Iran Pro League side Mes Kerman by Miroslav Blažević. After about one year working with Mes Kerman's staff, he began his work with Damash as an assistant manager. It was not the first time that one of Amir Abedini's teams used his services because Dražić's professional career in coaching started with Abedini.

References

External links

1963 births
Living people
People from Central Bosnia Canton
Association football defenders
Yugoslav footballers
Bosnia and Herzegovina footballers
Croatian footballers
Croatia international footballers
NK Solin players
HNK Hajduk Split players
Fortuna Düsseldorf players
HNK Šibenik players
Rot-Weiß Oberhausen players
Yugoslav First League players
Bundesliga players
2. Bundesliga players
Croatian Football League players
Croatian expatriate footballers
Expatriate footballers in Germany
Croatian expatriate sportspeople in Germany
Croatian football managers
Bosnia and Herzegovina football managers
HŠK Posušje managers
Gahar Zagros F.C. managers
NK GOŠK Gabela managers
HNK Segesta managers
FK Olimpik managers
Sanat Mes Kerman F.C. managers
Mes Rafsanjan F.C. managers
Premier League of Bosnia and Herzegovina managers
Croatian expatriate football managers
Expatriate football managers in Iran
Croatian expatriate sportspeople in Iran